The cult television show Freaks and Geeks used music from the show's time period, 1980–1981 for its soundtrack.

Because this called for using popular, established artists, purchasing the rights to use songs required much of the show's budget and became an obstacle in releasing the show on DVD; in fact, reruns seen on Fox Family replaced some of the songs with generic production music. However, Shout! Factory eventually brought Freaks and Geeks to DVD in 2004, with all of its music intact.

Complete series soundtrack list
The following is a complete list of the songs featured in Freaks and Geeks as they appear in the DVD booklet. Listed along with the titles of each song are the artist who performs the versions that appear in the series as well as the original album the track appeared on and that albums original year of release.

The opening credits of each episode are accompanied by the song "Bad Reputation", performed by Joan Jett from her 1980 Bad Reputation album.

101: Pilot episode

102: Beers and Weirs

103: Tricks and Treats

104: Kim Kelly is My Friend

105: Tests and Breasts

106: I'm With the Band

107: Carded and Discarded

108: Girlfriends and Boyfriends

109: We've Got Spirit

110: The Diary

111: Looks and Books

112: The Garage Door

113: Chokin' and Tokin'

114: Dead Dogs and Gym Teachers

115: Noshing and Moshing

116: Smooching and Mooching

117: The Little Things

118: Discos and Dragons

Notes and statistics
Over 120 songs are featured in the series.
The artist to be featured in the most episodes (5) is Van Halen.
The artist with the most songs in the series (9) is The Who.
The album to have the most songs in the series (5) is Van Halen's 1978 self-titled debut.
The oldest song to appear on the series (1955) is "The Monster" by Gene Krupa and Buddy Rich.
Other than instrumentals such as "Spacefunk" and score, and songs sung by characters such as "Lady L," the only songs to appear in the series that were not written or recorded until after 1981 are "Lime Green", "Happy Street" and "Punk Rock 101" by Diesel Boy (recorded in 1996).
The only songs to be featured in more than one episode are "Stomp!" by Brothers Johnson, "When the Saints Go Marching In" by the McKinley High Marching Band and "Spacefunk" by Paul Feig (all of which were used twice).
The producers had hoped to use "Only Love Can Break Your Heart" by Neil Young for the final scene of the "Noshing and Moshing" episode, but ended up substituting Dean Martin's "You're Nobody till Somebody Loves You" when they were unable to get the licensing rights to the Young song.

CD soundtrack release

A CD soundtrack for the series was released in 2004 from Shout! Factory. The CD soundtrack release contained nine songs featured in the series, eleven original Freaks and Geeks score tracks by Michael Andrews, three alternate cast recordings of songs performed on the show ("Lady L" being a fan favorite), an extra performance by "Feedback" and a bonus track by The Leaving Trains. The accompanying booklet features 15 pages of liner notes written by David Wild and Jake Kasdan as well as written track by track commentary by the Freaks and Geeks character, guidance counsellor Jeffery Theodore Rosso.

"Bad Reputation" - Joan Jett & The Blackhearts
"Geek Hallway" - Michael Andrews
"Poor, Poor Pitiful Me" - Warren Zevon
"Lindsay's Theme" - Michael Andrews
"Gettin' High" - Michael Andrews
"Look Sharp!" - Joe Jackson
"Clem's Theme" - Michael Andrews
"No Language in Our Lungs" - XTC
"Lindsay Disturbed Theme" - Michael Andrews
"Bill Gets Funky (A.K.A. Spacefunk)" - Paul Feig
"USA Rock" - Michael Andrews
"The Spirit of Radio" - Rush
"Daniel's Theme" - Michael Andrews
"I'm One" - The Who
"Porno Music" - Michael Andrews
"Neal's Lament" - Michael Andrews
"The Groove Line" - Heatwave
"Ken's Ode To Joy" - Michael Andrews
"Come Sail Away" - Styx
"End Title Theme" - Michael Andrews
"Lady L" - Jason Segel
"I'm Eighteen" - Dave (Gruber) Allen
"Jesus Is Just Alright" - Jason Segel/Sarah Hagan
"Up on Cripple Creek" - Dave (Gruber) Allen and Feedback
"Dumb As A Crayon" - The Leaving Trains

References

Television soundtracks
2004 soundtrack albums
Soundtrack
Shout! Factory compilation albums